Reeve is an unincorporated community located in the town of Vance Creek, Barron County, Wisconsin, United States.

A post office called Reeve was established in 1898, and remained in operation until 1913. Besides the post office, Reeve had two country stores.

Current Culture and Main Street 
Although Reeve is small, it is mighty in its vibrant culture. The town of Vance Creek has a park with disc golf and a metal play set that will bring you back to your childhood. There is a carousel for the mailboxes at the main crossroads in the town, further embedding the nostalgic feelings of both between times and between places. As you spend time in the main and only street of Reeve, you will smell hydrangeas blooming, hear laughter coming from the only bar, or the sound of the donkey in town keep time through braying at certain points, and remember what small town America is like.

Notes

Unincorporated communities in Barron County, Wisconsin
Unincorporated communities in Wisconsin